Hugo Ismael Vera Oviedo (born 1 January 1991) is a Paraguayan professional footballer who plays as a right-back for Gimnasia Jujuy.

Career
Vera began his career in his homeland with Olimpia, featuring four times in the Paraguayan Primera División in 2010. In July 2011, Vera completed a move to Argentine club Central Córdoba. One goal in twenty-five matches followed in Torneo Argentino A, prior to the defender signing for Primera B Nacional's Ferro Carril Oeste on 27 July 2012. He made his debut on 13 August against Libertad, which was one of eleven appearances in 2012–13. August 2013 saw Vera agree to rejoin Central Córdoba. A total of one hundred and twelve appearances followed in six seasons, as they won promotion from Torneo Federal A twice.

Career statistics
.

Honours
Central Córdoba
Torneo Federal A: 2017–18

References

External links

1991 births
Living people
Sportspeople from Asunción
Paraguayan footballers
Paraguayan expatriate footballers
Association football defenders
Club Olimpia footballers
Central Córdoba de Santiago del Estero footballers
Ferro Carril Oeste footballers
Instituto footballers
Gimnasia y Esgrima de Jujuy footballers
Paraguayan Primera División players
Argentine Primera División players
Torneo Argentino A players
Primera Nacional players
Torneo Federal A players
Expatriate footballers in Argentina
Paraguayan expatriate sportspeople in Argentina